Allawada is a village and panchayat falling with the limits of Ranga Reddy district, Telangana, India. It falls under Chevella mandal.

References

Villages in Ranga Reddy district